Vasyl Lischynskyi (18 March 1964 – 29 November 2015) was a Paralympian athlete from Ukraine competing mainly in category F11/12 throwing events.

Biography
Vasyl competed in four Paralympics, always competing in the shot and discus.  His first games were in 1996 where he won gold in the shot and silver in the discus.  2000 and 2004 proved barren games but in the 2008 Summer Paralympics in Beijing, China he won a gold medal in the F11/12 discus and a bronze in the F11/12 shot put.

Notes

External links
 

1964 births
2015 deaths
Paralympic athletes of Ukraine
Athletes (track and field) at the 1996 Summer Paralympics
Athletes (track and field) at the 2000 Summer Paralympics
Athletes (track and field) at the 2004 Summer Paralympics
Athletes (track and field) at the 2008 Summer Paralympics
Athletes (track and field) at the 2012 Summer Paralympics
Paralympic gold medalists for Ukraine
Paralympic silver medalists for Ukraine
Medalists at the 1996 Summer Paralympics
Medalists at the 2008 Summer Paralympics
Medalists at the 2012 Summer Paralympics
Paralympic medalists in athletics (track and field)
Ukrainian male discus throwers
Ukrainian male shot putters
Visually impaired discus throwers
Visually impaired shot putters
Paralympic discus throwers
Paralympic shot putters
20th-century Ukrainian people